"Gone Be Fine" is a R&B song written by producer Dallas Austin for Monica's second studio album, The Boy Is Mine (1998). Although not released as an official single, the song was released as a promotional recording to radio stations and peaked at #5 on the Billboard Bubbling Under R&B/Hip-Hop Singles on October 23, 1998. It features guest vocals by rap group OutKast.

Formats and track listings
These are the formats and track listings of promo single-releases of "Gone Be Fine."
 "Gone Be Fine" (Radio Mix)
 "Gone Be Fine" (Instrument)
 "Gone Be Fine" (Call Out Hook)

Charts

References

External links
 Official website of Monica

1999 singles
Monica (singer) songs
Outkast songs
Song recordings produced by Dallas Austin
Songs written by Dallas Austin
1999 songs
Arista Records singles